Tom Heydinger (August 24, 1940 – July 10, 2012) was a former judge and Democratic member of the Ohio House of Representatives who represented the 58th District briefly in 2008.

Life and career
A native of Plymouth, Ohio, Heydinger served in the Vietnam War, where he flew helicopters for the United States Army. He also worked as a lawyer in the Judge Advocate General's Corps.

A former judge, Heydinger served on the bench in Crawford County, Ohio, and as an assistant to the Ohio Attorney General. He also worked as a prosecutor for Huron County, Ohio. In 1975, Heydinger was appointed by Ohio Governor John Gilligan to the Huron County Common Pleas Court, Probate Division, a controversial decision at the time because of the issue of whether he had actually practiced law the requisite number of years to qualify for judicial office. However, a writ of quo warranto (pursuant to the Ohio Revised Code) was never filed, and the Ohio Supreme Court never ruled on the matter. Heydinger served as probate judge from 1975 until 2003.

Ohio House of Representatives
In early 2008, freshman representative Matt Barrett ran into ethics trouble after mistakenly showing pornographic content to high school students during a presentation. He subsequently resigned, leaving House Democrats to appoint a replacement to the seat. While numerous candidates applied for the position, Heydinger was chosen. He was sworn into office on May 21, 2008.

Initially, Heydinger sought to retain the seat in the 2008 election. However, Heydinger dropped out of the race, citing mounting health problems and influences from within the Ohio Democratic Party. The seat was won by Republican Terry Boose.

References

Democratic Party members of the Ohio House of Representatives
1940 births
2012 deaths
People from Plymouth, Ohio
21st-century American politicians